Joseph David Slye (born April 10, 1996) is an American football placekicker for the Washington Commanders of the National Football League (NFL). He played college football at Virginia Tech and signed as an undrafted free agent with the New York Giants in 2019. Slye has also been a member of the Carolina Panthers, Houston Texans, and San Francisco 49ers.

Early life and high school
Slye was born in Albuquerque, New Mexico but grew up in Stafford, Virginia. He attended North Stafford High School, where he played high school football. Slye was named all-state as both a kicker and as a linebacker for the Wolverines.

College career
Slye played four seasons for the Virginia Tech Hokies, opting to join the team as a walk-on over a scholarship offer from James Madison. He made 78 of 108 field goal attempts (72.2 percent) and 169 of 172 of extra point attempts (98.3 percent).

Professional career

After going unselected in the 2018 NFL Draft, Slye participated in a tryout for the Tampa Bay Buccaneers and received interest from the Cleveland Browns, but was not signed by either team.

New York Giants
Slye signed with the New York Giants on May 6, 2019, but was released on May 14, 2019. He was re-signed by the Giants on July 24, 2019, and waived again three days later.

Carolina Panthers

2019 season
Slye signed with the Carolina Panthers on August 1, 2019. Although originally brought in to serve as a "camp leg", Slye made seven of eight field goal attempts in the preseason, including three from beyond 50 yards out. He was named the Panthers' kicker for the 2019 season after Graham Gano was placed on injured reserve.

Slye made his NFL debut on September 8, 2019, against the Los Angeles Rams, missing his first career field goal attempt from 53 yards out but hitting his next two tries from 46 and 52 yards out while making all three of his extra point attempts. Slye was named the NFC Special Teams Player of the Week for Week 4 after going 3–3 on field goal attempts, including a 55-yarder, on September 29, 2019, against the Houston Texans. Slye finished his rookie season with 25 field goals on 32 attempts (78.1%) and made 31 of 35 extra points (88.6%).

2020 season
Slye signed a one-year extension with the Panthers on February 6, 2020. He made a career-high five field goals on five attempts in a 21–16 win over the Los Angeles Chargers on September 28, 2020. He was placed on the reserve/COVID-19 list by the Panthers on October 21, and was activated two days later. In Week 7 against the New Orleans Saints, Slye attempted an NFL record 65-yard field goal with 1:55 remaining in the 4th quarter, but was short by a few inches as the Panthers lost 27–24. Two weeks later against the Kansas City Chiefs, Slye missed another record attempt, this time from 67 yards as time expired. The Panthers lost 33–31. In Week 12 against the Minnesota Vikings, Slye missed another game winning field goal with four seconds remaining from 54 yards as the Panthers lost 28–27.

2021 season
Slye signed another one-year contract extension with the Panthers on January 5, 2021. Slye was released by the Panthers on August 28, 2021, after the team traded for Ryan Santoso.

Houston Texans
On September 7, 2021, Slye was signed to the Houston Texans practice squad. On September 11, he was elevated to the active roster following an injury to starting kicker Ka'imi Fairbairn. In 3 games, he connected on 4 of 5 field goal attempts and 7 of 8 extra point attempts. Slye was waived on September 30, 2021.

San Francisco 49ers
On October 5, 2021, Slye was signed by the San Francisco 49ers after an injury to Robbie Gould. Slye was waived on November 2, 2021, after Gould's return.

Washington Football Team / Commanders
Slye signed with the Washington Football Team on November 9, 2021. In Week 12 against the Seattle Seahawks, Slye suffered a hamstring injury after a blocked extra point attempt and was placed on injured reserve the following day. He was activated off injured reserve on December 25.

The team placed a restricted free agent tender on Slye on March 16, 2022, with Slye agreeing to a two-year contract worth around $5 million on April 11.

In Week 10 of the 2022 NFL season against the 8-0 Philadelphia Eagles, Slye played a key part in Washington's 32-21 upset win. He made all 4 of his field goals attempts, including a career long 58 yard field goal and another from 55 yards. For this performance, Slye was named NFC Special Teams player of the week. At the end of November 2022, he was named NFC Special Teams Player of the Month for his performance of 37 points, going 7 for 8 on extra points and 10 for 10 on field goals. In Week 13, he made two of three field goal attempts, missing a 52-yard attempt in the fourth quarter and with the game resulting in a 20-20 tie against the New York Giants.

References

External links
Washington Commanders bio
Virginia Tech Hokies bio

1996 births
Living people
American football placekickers
Carolina Panthers players
Houston Texans players
People from Stafford, Virginia
Players of American football from Albuquerque, New Mexico
Players of American football from Virginia
San Francisco 49ers players
Virginia Tech Hokies football players
New York Giants players
Washington Football Team players
Washington Commanders players